Shoot the Works is a 1934 American pre-Code comedy film directed by Wesley Ruggles and written by Claude Binyon, Gene Fowler, Howard J. Green and Ben Hecht. It is based on the Gene Fowler and Harold Hecht 1932 play The Great Magoo (and not, despite the title, the 1931 musical revue Shoot the Works).   The film stars Jack Oakie, Ben Bernie, Dorothy Dell, Alison Skipworth, Roscoe Karns, Arline Judge and William Frawley. The film was released on June 29, 1934, by Paramount Pictures, preceding by two days the beginning of the most rigorously enforced version of the Hollywood Production Code, which came into effect on July 1, 1934.

Plot

Cast
Jack Oakie as Nicky Nelson
Ben Bernie as Joe Davis
Dorothy Dell as Lily Raquel
Alison Skipworth as The Countess
Roscoe Karns as Sailor Burke
Arline Judge as Jackie Donovan
William Frawley as Larry Hale
Lew Cody as Axel Hanratty
Paul Cavanagh as Alvin Ritchie
Monte Vandergrift as Man from Board of Health
Jill Dennett as Wanda
Lee Kohlmar as Professor Jonas
Tony Merlo as Headwaiter
Ben Taggart as Detective
Charles McAvoy as Cop
Fred Lawrence as Crooner

References

External links
 

1934 films
American comedy films
1934 comedy films
Paramount Pictures films
Films directed by Wesley Ruggles
American black-and-white films
1930s English-language films
1930s American films